The 2017–18 Eastern Kentucky Colonels men's basketball team represented Eastern Kentucky University during the 2017–18 NCAA Division I men's basketball season. The Colonels, led by third-year head coach Dan McHale, played their home games at McBrayer Arena within Alumni Coliseum as members of the Ohio Valley Conference. They finished the season 11–20, 5–13 in OVC play to finish in a three-way tie for ninth place. They failed to make the OVC tournament for the third consecutive season.

On February 26, 2018, the school fired Dan McHale as head coach after three seasons. He finished at EKU with a three-year record of 38–55. On March 23, NC State assistant A.W. Hamilton was hired as the new head coach of the Colonels.

Previous season
The Colonels finished the season 12–19, 5–11 in OVC play to finish in last place in the East Division. They failed to qualify for the Ohio Valley tournament.

Preseason 
In a vote of Ohio Valley Conference head men’s basketball coaches and sports information directors, Eastern Kentucky was picked to finish fourth. Asante Gist was named to the preseason All-OVC team.

After five years of divisional play in the OVC, the conference eliminated divisions for the 2017–18 season. Additionally, for the first time, each conference team will play 18 conference games.

Roster

Schedule and results

|-
!colspan=9 style=| Exhibition

|-
!colspan=9 style=| Non-conference regular season

|-
!colspan=9 style=| Ohio Valley Conference regular season

Source

References

Eastern Kentucky Colonels men's basketball seasons
Eastern Kentucky
Eastern Kentucky
Eastern Kentucky